The School of Public Affairs and Governance, abbreviated as SPAG, is one of the constituent schools  of Silliman University, a private university, in Dumaguete, Philippines. Established in 2007, the school provides instruction in the undergraduate and graduate levels.  The school is located at the second floor of the Katipunan Hall at the main campus along Hibbard ave.

Academics
{| style="float:right; margin:1em 1em 1em 1em; width:18em; border: 1px solid #a0a0a0; padding: 2px; bg-color=yellow; text-align:right;"
|- style="text-align:center;"
|- bgcolor="#cd0e15" align="center"
|Deans of the School
|- style="text-align:left; font-size:x-small;"
|
 Dr. Reynaldo Rivera (2007-2013)
 Atty. Tabitha Espinosa-Tinagan (2013-2015)
 Dr. Jenny Chiu (2015-2018)
 Dr. Jojema Indab (2018-2021)
 Dr. Ferdinand Mangibin (2021–present)
}

Undergraduate
Bachelor of Science in Public Administration (BSPA)
Bachelor of Science in Foreign Affairs (BSFA)

Graduate
Master in Public Administration (MPA) with specialization in either:
Local Governance; or
Fiscal Administration
Master in Environmental Governance (MEG)

Post-Graduate
Doctor of Philosophy in Social Science (Ph.D. in Social Science)
Doctor of Public Administration (DPA)

Footnotes

External links
Silliman University official website

Public Affairs and Governance
Public administration schools
Public policy schools